Alessandra D'Ettorre (born 8 May 1978) is an Italian racing cyclist. She competed in the 2013 UCI women's team time trial in Florence.

References

External links
 

1978 births
Living people
Italian female cyclists
Place of birth missing (living people)
Sportspeople from the Province of L'Aquila
Cyclists from Abruzzo